Kham Tam Sa was a king of Lan Xang who ruled for five months, before he was assassinated by Nang Keo Phimpha. His father was Samsenthai and his mother was Queen Keo Sida of Sip Song Panna. Kham Tam Sa succeeded his brother Khon Kham. Before he was king he was appointed Governor of Pak Houei Luang, where he later fled before his assassination.

Family
Father: Samsenethai - King of Lan Xang (r.1372-1417)
Mother: Princess Nang Keava Sridha (Chao Nang Keo Sida) - daughter of Chao Sidhakama (Sida Kham), "Hsenwifa" of Muang Lü (Chieng Hung)
Consorts and their Respective Issue:
 by unknown women
 Prince Mui Dharmakama (Mui Ton-Kham) - rebelled against King Jayadiya and attempted to set himself up as an independent ruler at Vientiane. Defeated and executed at Done-Chan.

References

Kings of Lan Xang
Year of birth unknown
1432 deaths
15th-century Laotian people
15th-century monarchs in Asia
Laotian Theravada Buddhists